John Cowper Gray (1783 – May 18, 1823) was a U.S. Representative from Virginia.

Born in Southampton County, Virginia, Gray pursued an academic course.
He served as member of the State house of delegates 1804–1806 and 1821–1823.

Gray was elected as a Democratic-Republican to the Sixteenth Congress to fill the vacancy caused by the resignation of James Johnson and served from August 28, 1820, to March 3, 1821.
He was an unsuccessful candidate in 1820 for reelection to the Seventeenth Congress.
He died May 18, 1823.

Sources

1783 births
1823 deaths
Democratic-Republican Party members of the United States House of Representatives from Virginia
Members of the Virginia House of Delegates
19th-century American politicians